A Second Chance is a 2015 Filipino romantic drama film directed by Cathy Garcia-Molina starring John Lloyd Cruz and Bea Alonzo. The film is the sequel to Molina's 2007 film One More Chance.

The film, upon its release in the Philippines, is a box office success earned  in its opening day. A Second Chance also receive generally favorable reviews from film critics and audiences. On its 4th week, the film earned more than  worldwide to become the sixth highest-grossing Filipino film of all time.

Synopsis
In the continuation of Popoy and Basha's love story from One More Chance, we find the couple walking down the aisle and vowing to love each other "forever" and "ever." A Second Chance explores the realities and intricacies of Popoy and Basha's married life. We find Popoy as a failed achiever, struggling to keep his business and self-esteem intact, while Basha has given up so much in her life to keep their marriage together.

Cast

Lead Cast
 John Lloyd Cruz as Engineer Rodolfo "Popoy" Gonzales Jr.
 Bea Alonzo as Architect Belinda "Basha" Eugenio-Gonzales

Supporting cast
 Dimples Romana as Kristine "Krizzy" Del Rosario
 Janus Del Prado as Chinno Marquez
 James Blanco as Kenneth Del Rosario
 Bea Saw as Angeline "Anj" Tan
 Ahron Villena as JP
 Khalil Ramos as Noel
 Melissa Mendez as Elvie
 Al Tantay as Tito Willie
 Shamaine Buencamino as Rose
 Karen Dematera as Jacque
 Denise Joaquin as Guia
 Arlene Tolibas as Tansing

Special participation
 Billy Crawford as Pedro Gonzales
 Arci Muñoz as Arah Cervantes
 Sue Ramirez as Marie

Production

Pre-production

Release
A Second Chance was released in the Philippines on November 25, 2015. The film also premiered in major cities in Europe starting December 5, 2015.

Marketing
Star Cinema released a series of promotional materials at their personal account to promote the film. On August 17, 2015, the studio released a teaser of the film, which was followed by the first theatrical teaser on November 2, 2015 and a new and longer teaser on November 14, 2015.

Reception

Box office
Based upon the Philippine box office records, the movie beat out the  2015 record of the romantic comedy movie Crazy Beautiful You. As of November 27, 2015, the film has earned . On November 29, 2015, A Second Chance grossed . Major cinemas nationwide reported that they added more midnight screenings of the movie "due to the deluge of audience in the evening."
As of November 30, 2015, the film has already grossed , 6 days since its initial release in the Philippines. After 10 days of its release, ABS CBN reported that the movie has passed the  mark. More than 4 weeks after its release, Star Cinema has announced that the film has already grossed more than  worldwide making it the first Filipino film to reach the  mark.

Critical reception
The film received generally favorable reviews.
Francis Joseph Cruz of Rappler.com writes, "Thankfully, A Second Chance gives honesty a chance within the business of weaving fables out of the romantic affairs of fictional people. In fact, it is almost a thorough middle-class drama, one that is as sensitive to the unwieldy aspirations of millennial couples as it is to the expectations of its paying audience. Its audacious mix of genre standards with an acute sense of belongingness in this real world of economic ambitions that are almost often betrayed is sincerely rewarding."

Philberty Dy of ClickTheCity rates the movie 4 out of 5 stating, "They break through the barrier of artificiality, and deliver bits of emotion that cannot be ignored. And that’s really something, even given the flaws."

Atty. Ferdinand Topacio asserted in his review posted in Fashionpulis.com that, "A Second Chance is a cut above the rest, intelligent yet entertaining, and everything is above par: direction, editing and writing. The acting part is a given, with two of today's best in the field – John Lloyd Cruz and Bea Alonzo – playing the leads."

Irish Eden Belleza of Gulf News in Dubai criticized the film's focus on the two main casts who, according to her, dominated almost every scenes in the movie, and wrote "The movie could have added a little more depth to the characters." However, she said that "for those in rocky relationships looking for reassurance that there is hope at the end of the tunnel and, well, a second chance, this is one feel-good movie they should watch."

International release
Star Cinema announced that the film will be released in Europe starting December 5, 2015. This is after ABS-CBN president  and CEO Charo Santos-Concio announced during the recently held iEmmys in New York City that the Kapamilya network and its international arm, The Filipino Channel (TFC), will soon "raise the curtain for more Pinoy greats at Europe’s major theaters." A Second Chance will be screened in Vue Cinemas in the United Kingdom and via other major theaters in Milan, Rome, Messina, Padova, Paris, Madrid, and Vienna starting December 5 and 6. it was also shown in Singapore from December 12 to 13, 2015.

References

External links
 

2015 films
Filipino-language films
2015 romantic drama films
Philippine romantic drama films
Philippine sequel films
Star Cinema films
Star Cinema drama films
Films about marriage